Gertrude Maesmore Morris (née Wilmot; 1872–1952), often known as Mrs Maesmore Morris, was an English actress born in London who rose to fame in Australia. Her marriage to Maesmore Morris ended in divorce in 1905.

References

External links

1872 births
1952 deaths
English stage actresses